Eurycercus is a genus of crustaceans belonging to the suborder Anomopoda. It is the only genus in the monotypic family Eurycercidae.

Species
There are 16 species:

Subgenus Eurycercus (Bullatifrons) Frey, 1975:
 Eurycercus (Bullatifrons) longirostris Hann, 1982
 Eurycercus (Bullatifrons) macracanthus Frey, 1973
 Eurycercus (Bullatifrons) pompholygodes Frey, 1975
 Eurycercus (Bullatifrons) vernalis Hann, 1982
Subgenus Eurycercus (Eurycercus) Baird, 1843:
 Eurycercus (Eurycercus) lamellatus (O.F. Müller, 1776)
 Eurycercus (Eurycercus) microdontus Frey, 1978
Subgenus Eurycercus (Teretifrons) Frey, 1975:
 Eurycercus (Teretifrons) glacialis Lilljeborg, 1887
 Eurycercus (Teretifrons) nigracanthus Hann, 1990
Subgenus not determined:
 Eurycercus beringi Bekker, Kotov & Taylor, 2012
 Eurycercus cunninghami King, 1853
 Eurycercus lamellatus (O.F. Müller, 1776)
 Eurycercus meridionalis Bekker, Kotov & Elmoor-Loureiro, 2010
 Eurycercus minutus Birabén, 1939
 Eurycercus nipponica Tanaka & Fujita, 2002
 Eurycercus norandinus Aranguren, Monroy & Gaviria, 2010
 Eurycercus spinosus King, 1853

References

Diplostraca
Branchiopoda genera
Taxa named by Spencer Fullerton Baird